The Solution to the Mystery is a 1915 short film produced by the American Film Manufacturing Company, released by Mutual Film and directed by  B. Reeves Eason.

Cast
 Vivian Rich as Bessie Mitchell
 Roy Stewart as James T. Willard
 Charles Newton as Wilbur Mitchell
 Gayne Whitman as Franklyn Davis

External links

1915 films
1915 short films
American silent short films
American black-and-white films
American Film Company films
Films directed by B. Reeves Eason
1910s American films